Northwest Biotherapeutics is a development-stage American pharmaceutical company headquartered in Maryland that focuses on developing immunotherapies against different types of cancer. It was founded in 1996 by Alton L. Boynton.

Business model
Northwest relies upon the contract manufacturing organization Cognate Bioservices for services supporting manufacture of its products for clinical trials.  Their relationship with Cognate began before 2007, and is slated to extend through the first quarter of 2016.  Due to cash flow issues common to development-stage companies, Northwest compensates Cognate through a combination of cash payments and stock. Cognate has also provided Northwest with at least one short-term loan, provided and paid in mid-2013.  , Northwest's expanding clinical trials have led to an increased reliance on Cognate's services, and subsequent renegotiation of their agreement.

Technology
The DCVax technology upon which NWBO's therapies rely involves injecting cancer patients with dendritic cells which have been harvested from them by leukapheresis (i.e. they are "autologous") and activated by incubating them in vitro with tissue from the patient's tumour.  The dendritic cells thereby identify the antigenic make-up of the tumour after which the activated dendritic cells are injected subcutaneously into the patients in aliquots at intervals.  Alternatively, in a process still under development, the harvested dendritic cells are injected directly into the tumour where they are activated in situ with the same result.   The activated dendritic cells pass information to generations of "killer" T-cells and B-cells so that those immune cells can recognise and attack the tumourous tissue wherever it may be found.

Dendritic cells
Northwest Biotherapeutics currently has three different DCVax cancer treatments in various levels of clinical trial.  All three utilize dendritic cells, one of many types of white blood cells. The basic principle behind the therapy is that if one injects or creates a large enough number of dendritic cells carrying mutant proteins matching a cancer, they excite enough T-cells and B-cells to overwhelm the cancer's defenses.

DCVax-L
DCVax-L is a solid-tumor cancer therapy currently in Phase III clinical testing in the US, Canada, Germany and the UK, for newly diagnosed GBM, a common and aggressive form of brain cancer.  In Germany, it is being tested on all "gliomas", not just newly diagnosed GBM.

In this variation of the DCVax line, the tumor is removed through surgery, and some of the tumor presented to the aforementioned dendritic cells for the scavenging of tumor proteins.  These dendritic cells, laden with tumor protein antigens, are then injected under the skin near lymph nodes.  The dendritic cells then travel to the local lymph node where the dendritic cells present the proteins to the T- and B-cells, as previously described.

These dendritic cells are grown in the lab from stem cells extracted from the patient's blood.  Only a sugar-cube-sized sample of the tumor is needed for subsequent presentation to the dendritic cells.  The tumor sample is first broken down into constituent proteins using a caustic process known as lysing (thus the L in the name DCVax-L).  After the resulting "tumor lysate" is presented to the dendritic cells, they are ready for subcutaneous injection near the selected lymph node(s). (There are approximately 500 lymph nodes in the body; most are peripheral, some are internal.)

DCVax-Direct

DCVax-Direct, the latest addition to the DCVax line, is currently in Phase 1 trials in the US.  It does not require removal of the tumor, making it ideal for inoperable tumors, if proven effective.  It is currently in Phase 1 testing on patients with inoperable tumors of a very large range of cancer types.

In the procedure, dendritic cells are developed as in DCVax-L, prior to antigen exposure/"pulsing".  However, the subsequent exposure to tumor antigens does not occur in vitro but in vivo: The prepared dendritic cells, along with adjuncts, are injected directly into one or more tumors.
  
At least two adjuncts are added to the dendritic cells. One adjunct excites a general aspect of the body's immune response; another excites a more tumor-specific response.  This mixture is then injected into the patient's tumor.  There, the dendritic cells are expected to scavenge tumor proteins, then find their way to the local lymph node for presentation of the tumor protein antigens to T cells and B cells.  The activated T and B cells then travel to the tumor and kill tumor cells.  Ruptured tumor cells release more mutant proteins that are picked up by dendritic cells and other immune cells, and are carried to the lymph nodes to excite still more B and T cells.  Theoretically, this cycle repeats, accelerates, then levels off at a high but safe level. The Phase 1 trial that finished enrollment in July, 2014 seeks to confirm this.

DCVax-L and DCVax-Direct, if effective, could address virtually all forms of solid tumor cancers, operable and inoperable, with the possible exception of prostate cancer.

Products
DCVax-L is now in Phase 3 trials in USA & Europe. It was awarded orphan drug status.

DCVax-Direct is a therapy to treat inoperable solid tumors in Phase 1 trials in the US.

DCVax-Prostate finished Phase 2 trials and has been approved for Phase 3 trials in the US.

Footnotes and references

External links
Northwest Biotherapeutics homepage

Biotechnology companies of the United States
Pharmaceutical companies of the United States
Companies listed on the Nasdaq
Health care companies based in Maryland
Companies based in Bethesda, Maryland